Corryocactus brevistylus or  is a species of columnar cactus found in Peru. It is most noteworthy for  its exceptionally long and formidable spines, up to ten inches (25 centimeters) in length.

References

External links
 
 

brevistylus